Ulman Stromer (6 January 1329 – 3 April 1407) was a German long-distance trader, factory owner and councillor of Nuremberg, then a free imperial city of the Holy Roman Empire. He ran the family enterprise, one of the largest of the prospering trade center, from 1370 until his death by the plague in 1407.

In 1390, he established the first permanent paper mill north of the Alps, at the Pegnitz river not far from the city.:

Stromer decided to start a paper-mill after he recognised the success that this business was having in Italy. In order to secure the know-how he employed the Italian brothers Marco and Francisco di Marchia and their boy Bartolomeo, bringing them to Nuremberg.

References

Sources 

Businesspeople from Nuremberg
1329 births
1407 deaths
Papermakers
14th-century German businesspeople
15th-century German businesspeople
Medieval German merchants